Sir Percy Walter Greenaway, 1st Baronet (11 June 1874 – 25 November 1956) was Lord Mayor of London for 1932 to 1933.

See also 
Greenaway baronets

References 

20th-century lord mayors of London
Knights Bachelor
1874 births
1956 deaths
Place of birth missing
Place of death missing